Van Maanen is a Dutch toponymic surname meaning "from ", a former town in Gelderland now part of Ede. Variants include Van Manen and Van Maenen. People with this name include:

 Adriaan van Maanen (1884–1946), Dutch-American astronomer
 Cornelis Felix van Maanen (1769–1849), Dutch minister and jurist
 Gregory Van Maanen (born 1937), American painter and Vietnam war veteran
 Harold Van Maanen (born 1928), American (Iowa) politician
 John Van Maanen (born 1943), American professor of management
 Willem G. van Maanen (1920–2012), Dutch journalist and writer

See also
 Van Maanen (crater), a lunar crater named after Adriaan van Maanen
 Van Maanen's Star, a white dwarf discovered by Adriaan van Maanen
 Van Maanen (family), Dutch patrician family, descendants of Wouter van Maanen (*c.1625)

References

Dutch-language surnames
Toponymic surnames